Road 24 is a road within East Azerbaijan Province, in the Iranian Kurdistan region of northwestern Iran. It connects the town of Hashtrud to Maraqeh and Bonab.

See also

References

External links 

 Iran roads map on Young Journalists Club

24
Transportation in East Azerbaijan Province